Avengers 1959 is a 2011 five issue comic book miniseries written and drawn by Howard Chaykin. The story takes place in 1959 and concerns Nick Fury leading an early incarnation of the Avengers who hunt down Nazi war criminals who escaped justice after World War II. The team consists of Nick Fury, Dum Dum Dugan, Sabretooth, Dominic Fortune, Namora, Kraven the Hunter, Ulysses Bloodstone, Silver Sable (father of the more familiar, female character), and the Blonde Phantom.

Publication history
The series was published in France in 2012.

Plot
In Latveria, the Blonde Phantom is working undercover to discover a supposed secret Nazi plot. She is pretending to date a former Nazi general named Dieter Skul who was believed to have been killed during the war, but is alive and acting as a part of this plot. The general gets suspicious when he finds the Phantom snooping in his bedroom, but she flirts her way out of trouble. Meanwhile, Geoffrey Sydenham is in Wakanda to develop a covert diplomatic relationship between the African nation and the United States, though it becomes apparent that all is not as it seems.

After surviving an attempt on his life, Nick Fury arrives home to find Powell McTeague there wishing to speak with him. McTeague reveals that he was sent by General Hill to give Fury unofficial orders to travel to Hassenstadt in Latveria in order to continue his secret war against surviving Nazi war criminals. In Hassenstadt, he meets his friend Eric Koenig, now an American diplomat to Latveria, and introduces him to the Blonde Phantom. She reveals that she was dating the General as a means of finding out more information about a possible large-scale Nazi plot before she was caught eavesdropping. The Wakandan Ambassador to Latveria also reveals that their prince T'Chaka was kidnapped and he believes it to be the work of the same people that Fury is chasing. In Washington D.C., General Hill and his men investigate a possible Nazi safe-house. The occupants appeared to have been tipped off, however, as the house is booby-trapped, killing Hill's men. Geoffrey Sydenham is unnoticed as he slinks away from the crime scene.

Fury and the Phantom go to check out a hideout that was mentioned in one of Skul's files, finding the Hollow Men, mindless Nazi zombies, inside. Fury manages to blow up the building before he and the Phantom disappear into the shadows. The rest of the Avengers find themselves teleported aboard a ship in the South China Sea by Powell McTeague. The ship is led by the Nazi war criminals Baron Blood and Brain Drain who the Avengers immediately attack. After defeating them, the Nazis are transported away by Geoffrey Sydenham who wants to recruit them into his own army. In Washington D.C., Senator Sanford and Sydenham attempt to sway General Hill to their way of thinking, but the General storms out of the room, calling them insane after Sydenham insinuates that America and the Nazis should have been allies during World War II.

Nick Fury and the Blonde Phantom steal a Latverian fighter plane in order to leave the country without being seen on a commercial flight. Traveling to Wakanda, the pair are given information that should lead them to General Skul, borrowing Howard Stark's hydrofoil to get there as quickly as possible. During their journey, however, they come under attack by the Ubermadchen, but are quickly saved by the rest of the Avengers who happen by just in time thanks to Powell McTeague's magic.

The Avengers interrogate the Ubermadchen before allowing Sabretooth to kill them. The team then travels to the island of Madripoor where they discover a mansion headquarters belonging to their enemies. The Avengers raid the mansion, capturing the strategist known as Innsbruck the Planner. From him the team learns of General Skul's attack on the technologically advanced nation of Wakanda. Utilizing Powell McTeague's teleportation abilities, the group are able to get to Wakanda just in time to battle Skul's men.

Sydenham and Sanford again try to recruit General Hill to their cause, but are rejected outright by the General. That night an assassin is teleported to the General's bedside as he lies asleep. A watching Gorilla-Man (Ken Hale), however, saves the General's life. The two investigate the dead man's body only to discover that he has been dead for several days rather than minutes. The Avengers defeat ICON's forces who are attempting to attack Wakanda, before teleporting to Washington D.C. where they confront ICON's leader, Geoffrey Sydenham and the rest of his operatives. After taking down Brain Drain, Baron Blood, Geist, Spider Queen (Shannon Kane), and the Hollow Men, they take Sydenham into custody.

The Avengers each go their separate ways shortly after defeating the terrorist organization with Nick Fury's thanks. Shortly after his, Fury and McTeague discover that Sydenham has been released in exchange for his cooperation in locating the missing Wakandan prince T'Chaka. Sydenham is later seen in Greenwich Village continuing his use of the dark arts.

Reception
The series holds an average rating of 7.5 by twelve professional critics on the review aggregation website Comic Book Roundup.

Chad Nevett of CBR.com stated that the first issue delivered on everything that a fan of Chaykin could want but that the coloring works against his art.

References

External links

Avengers (comics) titles
Comics by Howard Chaykin
2011 comics debuts
Nick Fury titles